Whirr / Nothing is a split EP by the American shoegaze bands Whirr and Nothing, released on November 17, 2014 by Run for Cover. The EP was released digitally as well as in 12-inch vinyl format with an etched B-side packaged with a documentary DVD. Nothing announced the EP in February 2014, prior to the release of its debut album Guilty of Everything, describing the split release as "very accessible" and noting a tentative release date of early 2014.

Nothing released a music video for the track "Chloroform" on the date that the EP was released.

Critical reception

AllMusic critic Tim Sendra wrote: "The EP is a nice little capper for a tremendous year and presents a strong case that Nothing and Whirr are the best noise-soaked, '90s-worshiping, pedal-hopping guitar bands around". Punknews.org stated that "both bands don't skip a beat here and it's four of their best", and further commented, "These bands continue in a musical vein that allows both to showcase how different they are to each other but also, just how these dissimilar sounds collide to make brutally honest and genuinely moving music".

Track listing
 "Ease" (Whirr) – 3:27
 "Lean" (Whirr) – 5:01
 "Chloroform" (Nothing) – 4:41
 "July the Fourth" (Nothing) – 3:40

References

External links
Whirr / Nothing on Bandcamp

2014 EPs
Shoegaze EPs
Run for Cover Records EPs
Split EPs
Albums produced by Will Yip
Whirr (band) albums
Nothing (band) albums